The El Paso Holocaust Museum and Study Center is located at 715 N. Oregon in the city and county of El Paso, in the U.S. state of Texas. The museum was founded in 1994 by Holocaust survivor Henry Kellen. It was established to educate the public about the Nazi dictatorship, its concentration camps, and resistance movements during World War II. Funding for the museum is provided through donations and grants.

Admission, hours
Admission is free to the public.

The museum is open six days a week. It is closed on Mondays, most national holidays, and Passover, Rosh Hashanah and Yom Kippur.

Hours: Tuesday-Friday 9 a.m. – 5 p.m.; Saturday and Sunday 1 p.m. – 5 p.m.

See also
List of museums in West Texas

References

External links
El Paso Holocaust Museum and Study Center
 Henry Kellen Created El Paso Holocaust Museum Borderlands (EPCC)

Museums in El Paso, Texas
Museums established in 1994
Holocaust museums in Texas
1994 establishments in Texas